The 2015 African Games women's football tournament qualification decided the participating teams of the 2015 African Games women's football tournament. A total of eight teams qualified to play in the women's football tournament, including Congo who qualified automatically as hosts. Both the qualifying rounds and the final tournament were open to full women's national teams (unlike the men's tournament, which was age-restricted).

Teams
A total of 17 teams entered the qualifying rounds, organized by the Confederation of African Football (CAF).

Format
Qualification ties were played on a home-and-away two-legged basis. If the aggregate score was tied after the second leg, the away goals rule would be applied, and if still level, the penalty shoot-out would be used to determine the winner (no extra time would be played).

The seven winners of the second round qualified for the final tournament.

Schedule
The schedule of the qualifying rounds was as follows.

Qualification rounds

First round

|}

Note: Madagascar played their first FIFA sanctioned international match. Gabon and Libya withdrew. Gabon were not approved to travel by the Ministry of Youth and Sports.

Mali won on walkover.

Botswana won 3–2 on aggregate.

Guinea-Bissau won on walkover.

Second round
Winners qualified for 2015 African Games.

|}

Note: Guinea-Bissau withdrew.

Nigeria won 9–1 on aggregate.

South Africa won 6–0 on aggregate.

Ghana won 4–3 on aggregate.

Tanzania won 6–5 on aggregate.

Cameroon won 4–2 on aggregate.

Ivory Coast won on walkover.

Egypt won 2–1 on aggregate.

Qualified teams
The following eight teams qualified for the final tournament.

1 Bold indicates champion for that year. Italic indicates host for that year.

On 26 August 2015, the CAF announced that Egypt had withdrawn from the competition. Senegal, the team eliminated by Egypt in the final round, declined to replace them due to short notice. Therefore, only seven teams competed in the final tournament.

Goalscorers
3 goals
 Asha Rashid

2 goals

 Madeleine Ngono Mani
 Desire Oparanozie
 Francisca Ordega
 Asisat Oshoala
 Grace Chanda
 Misozi Zulu

1 goal

 Phatshimo Bosa
 Amogelang Moahi
 Thuto Ramafifi
 Claudine Meffometou
 Gabrielle Onguéné
 Nada Nasser
 Salma Tarik
 Loza Abera
 Elizabeth Addo
 Agnes Aduako
 Portia Boakye
 Samira Suleman
 Regina Mamiseheno
 Marie Raharimalala
 Awa Tangara
 Evelyn Nwabuoku
 Ngozi Okobi
 Esther Sunday
 Binta Diakhaté
 Amanda Dlamini
 Mamello Makhabane
 Noko Matlou
 Portia Modise
 Sanah Mollo
 Silindile Ngubane
 Shelder Boniface
 Sophia Mwasikili
 Mwanahamisi Shurua
 Ireen Lungu
 Emmaculate Msipa
 Rudo Neshamba
 Samkelisiwe Zulu

Own goal
 Annette Ngo Ndom (playing against Ethiopia)

See also
Football at the 2015 African Games – Men's qualification

References

External links
African Games Women 2015, Qualifiers, CAFonline.com
Season at futbol24.com

Women's Qualification
2015
African Games - Women's Qualification
African Games - Women's Qualification